Medea is a 2017 Costa Rican drama film directed by Alexandra Latishev Salazar. It was selected as the Costa Rican entry for the Best Foreign Language Film at the 91st Academy Awards, but it was not nominated.

Cast
 Liliana Biamonte as María José
 Erick Calderon as Carlos
 Javier Montenegro as Javier

See also
 List of submissions to the 91st Academy Awards for Best Foreign Language Film
 List of Costa Rican submissions for the Academy Award for Best Foreign Language Film

References

External links
 

2017 films
2017 drama films
Costa Rican drama films
2010s Spanish-language films